Bartonella koehlerae is a bacterium first isolated from cats. Its genome consists of 1.7-1.8 Mb.

See also
Bartonella doshiae
Bartonella grahamii

References

Further reading

Mascarelli, Patricia E. "Bartonella henselae and B. koehlerae DNA in Birds."

External links
Bartonella-Associated Infections – CDC
Bartonella species - List of Prokaryotic names with Standing in Nomenclature

Type strain of Bartonella koehlerae at BacDive -  the Bacterial Diversity Metadatabase

Gram-negative bacteria
Bartonellaceae
Bacteria described in 2000